opened near Nanzen-ji in Kyoto, Japan, in 1984. The sukiya-style building has two rooms for displaying exhibits and there is also a chashitsu. The collection, based on that built up by financier Tokushichi Nomura II, comprises some 1,700 works (paintings, calligraphic works, Noh masks, Noh costumes, and tea utensils), including seven Important Cultural Properties and nine Important Art Objects.

Important Cultural Properties

See also
 Kyoto National Museum
 Nomura Securities
 Philosopher's Walk
 Bokuseki

References

External links

  Nomura Art Museum 
  Nomura Art Museum

Art museums and galleries in Japan
Museums in Kyoto
Art museums established in 1984
1984 establishments in Japan
Nomura Holdings